Coelopellini is a tribe of kelp flies in the family Coelopidae.

Genera
 Amma McAlpine, 1991
 Beaopterus Lamb, 1909
 Coelopella Malloch, 1933
 Icaridion Lamb, 1909Halteres absent and the wings are reduced to strips. New Zealand.
 Rhis McAlpine, 1991
 This McAlpine, 1991

References

Coelopidae